( Blijdorp Zoo), officially Rotterdam Zoo, is a zoo located in the northwestern part of Rotterdam. Divided into several zoogeographic regions, the 26-hectare (64.25-acre) Blijdorp Zoo boasts well over 180 species. It also has a shop, multiple cafes, and an information centre.

The zoo is a member of the Dutch Zoo Federation (NVD) and the European Association of Zoos and Aquaria (EAZA). In 2007, it celebrated its 150th anniversary.

History

In 1855, a garden was set up for pheasants and waterfowl in the center of Rotterdam, near the Kruiskade. It was a success and on May 18, 1857, the 'Rotterdamsche Diergaarde' was opened as a sequel. The first director was the animal trainer Henri Martin. The same year the 'Vereniging Rotterdamsche Diergaarde' was founded. In 1932 it was decided to reorganize the zoo. In 1937 it was decided to move the zoo to a new location. The zoo exchanged land with the municipality: the municipality received part of the old zoo for free, the rest they had to pay for. In exchange, the zoo became the owner of two-thirds of a new 13-hectare site in the Blijdorp district, while one-third of the new site had to be leased at one guilder. On October 26, 1938, the 'Vereniging' was dissolved, and the 'Rotterdamsche Diergaarde Foundation' was established. The Rotterdam Zoo moved to its new location  prior to the bombing of Rotterdam in World War II, which destroyed most of the city centre. The original zoo had been heavily damaged in a bombing two days prior to the Blitz, but it had not been touched by the main bombardment on May 14, 1940. The new zoo at Blijdorp was rebuilt slightly to the north, where it opened to the public in its current location on December 7, 1940. The new zoo was designed by Dutch architect Sybold van Ravesteyn, who designed the central railway station of Rotterdam as well. In 2001, Blijdorp became almost twice as large when it opened a new western part, which includes the Oceanium aquarium. In 2007, the zoo was declared a rijksmonument.

In May 2007 the zoo appeared in the news when Bokito, Blijdorp's silverback gorilla, escaped from his enclosure and seriously injured a female visitor. Before the attack, the woman was a regular visitor of the zoo (on average 4 times per week) and claimed to have a special bond with Bokito, regularly touching the glass between her and the gorilla, making eye contact with him and smiling at him.

In October 2010, the city of Rotterdam decided to reduce its yearly funding of Blijdorp from nearly 4.5 to about 0.8 million euro until 2015. The zoo and its supporters protested the decision, claiming it is unclear if the zoo can continue to operate with the reduced budget.

In March 2014, the zoo made headlines when a giraffe licked a former zoo cleaner whose last wish was to revisit the zoo, as he was dying of terminal brain cancer. The video went viral worldwide quickly.

Breeding programs

Diergaarde Blijdorp participates in about 70 breeding programs and studbooks, and coordinates a number of these, including the international breeding program for red pandas, EEPs for Asian elephant, Komodo dragon, red-crowned and Siberian crane, Visayan warty pig and Egyptian tortoise, and the ESB (European Studbook) for the crowned pigeons.

Botanical garden
Blijdorp also houses a botanical garden and manages both the Dutch National Bromelia Collection and the Dutch National Primula Collection.

Oceanium

The Oceanium is an aquarium that opened in the zoo in 2001. The Oceanium lies in the expansion area of the zoo, which includes a new entrance and parking area, and was the biggest project to date for the zoo. The area around the Oceanium is home to projects depicting the Americas.

Animal list

Asia

 Chinese Garden 
Tufted deer (Elaphodus cephalophus)
François' langur (Trachypithecus francoisi)
Eurasian otter (Lutra lutra)

 The Amur 
Greater flamingo (Phoenicopterus roseus)
White stork (Ciconia ciconia)
Amur leopard (Panthera pardus orientalis)
Northern hawk-owl (Surnia ulula)
Dalmatian pelican (Pelecanus crispus)
Great cormorant (Phalacrocorax carbo)
Manchurian crane (Grus japonensis)

 Malaysian Forest Edge & Asia House 
Visayan warty pig (Sus cebifrons)
Visayan spotted deer (Cervus alfredi)
Lion-tailed macaque (Macaca silenus)
Fishing cat (Prionailurus viverrinus)
Banteng (Bos javanicus)
Blackbuck (Antilope cervicapra)
Wreathed hornbill (Aceros undulatus)
Indian eagle-owl (Bubo bengalensis)
Bali myna (Leucopsar rothschildi)
Crested partridge (Rollulus rouloul)
Black-naped fruit dove (Ptilinopus melanospilus)
Roti Island snake-necked turtle (Chelodina mccordi)
Amboina box turtle (Cuora amboinensis)
Komodo dragon (Varanus komodoensis)
Chinese crocodile lizard (Shinisaurus crocodilurus)
Philippine sailfin lizard (Hydrosaurus pustulatus)
Plum-headed parakeet (Psittacula cyanocephala)
Indian cobra (Naja naja)
Rhinoceros ratsnake (Rhynchophis boulengeri)

 Asian Swamp 
White-naped crane (Grus vipio)
Demoiselle crane (Anthropoides virgo)
Sulawesi crested macaque (Macaca nigra)
Little egret (Egretta garzetta)
Black-headed ibis (Threskiornis melanocephalus)
Painted stork (Mycteria leucocephala)
Milky stork (Mycteria cinerea)
Woolly-necked stork (Ciconia episcopus)
Black-crowned night heron (Nycticorax nycticorax)
Pied imperial pigeon (Ducula bicolor)
Fulvous whistling duck (Dendrocygna bicolor)
Green peafowl (Pavo muticus)

 Mongolian Steppe 
Bactrian camel (Camelus bactrianus)
Pallas's cat (Otocolobus manul)

 Taman Indah 
Indian rhinoceros (Rhinoceros unicornis)
Asian elephant (Elephas maximus)
Indian python (Python molurus)
Malayan tapir (Tapirus indicus)

 Tiger Creek 
Sumatran tiger (Panthera tigris sondaica)

 Other animals 
Red panda (Ailurus fulgens fulgens)

Europe
Finnish forest reindeer (Rangifer tarandus fennicus)

Africa

 Gorilla exhibit 
Western lowland gorilla (Gorilla gorilla gorilla)
Greater spot-nosed monkey (Cercopithecus nictitans)

 Congo 
Crested guinea fowl (Guttera pucherani)
Guinea turaco (Tauraco persa)
Okapi (Okapia johnstoni)
Red river hog (Potamochoerus porcus)
Eastern bongo (Tragelaphus eurycerus isaaci)
Kirk's dik-dik (Madoqua kirkii)
Northern carmine bee-eater (Merops nubicus)
 Several other bird species

 Savanna 
Reticulated giraffe (Giraffa camelopardalis reticulata)
Chapman's zebra (Equus quagga chapmani)
Greater kudu (Tragelaphus strepsiceros)
Common ostrich (Struthio camelus)
Marabou stork (Leptoptilos crumeniferus)
Hamerkop (Scopus umbretta)
Grey crowned crane (Balearica regulorum)
White-backed vulture (Gyps africanus)
Rüppell's vulture (Gyps rueppellii)
White-headed vulture (Trigonoceps occipitalis)
Hooded vulture (Necrosyrtes monachus)
Southern ground hornbill (Bucorvus leadbeateri)
Spotted hyena (Crocuta crocuta)
Serval (Leptailurus serval)
Yellow mongoose (Cynictis penicillata)
Cape ground squirrel (Xerus inauris)
Black-headed weaver (Ploceus melanocephalus)

 Crocodile river 

Nile crocodile (Crocodylus niloticus)
West African slender-snouted crocodile (Crocodylus cataphractus)
Sudan plated lizard (Broadleysaurus major)
African spurred tortoise (Geochelone sulcata)
Pancake tortoise (Malacochersus tornieri)
Black and rufous elephant shrew (Rhynchocyon petersi)
Cape porcupine (Hystrix africaeaustralis)
Rock hyrax (Procavia capensis)

 Others 
Von der Decken's hornbill (Tockus deckeni)
Western plantain-eater (Crinifer piscator)
Superb starling (Lamprotornis superbus)
Crowned lapwing (Vanellus coronatus)
Pygmy hippopotamus (Hexaprotodon liberiensis)
Black rhinoceros (Diceros bicornis)
Mhorr gazelle (Nanger dama mhorr)

Rivièrahal
Corsican fire salamander (Salamandra corsica)
Yellow anaconda (Eunectes notaeus)
Hyacinth macaw (Anodorhynchus hyacinthinus)
Toco toucan (Ramphastos toco)

South America
Vicuña (Vicugna vicugna)
Darwin's rhea (Rhea pennata)
Greater guinea pig (Cavia magna)
Southern pudu (Pudu puda)
Scarlet ibis (Eudocimus ruber)
Southern screamer (Chauna torquata)
Blue-and-yellow macaw (Ara ararauna)
Scarlet macaw (Ara macao)

North America

 Prairie 
Plains bison (Bison bison bison)
Black-tailed prairie dog (Cynomys ludovicianus)

 Arctica 
Polar bear (Ursus maritimus)
Arctic fox (Vulpes lagopus)
Snowy owl (Bubo scandiacus)
Steller's sea eagle (Haliaeetus pelagicus)
 Raccoon (Procyon lotor)

Oceanium

 Bass Rock 
Atlantic puffin (Fratercula arctica)
Common guillemot (Uria aalge)
Black-legged kittiwake (Rissa tridactyla)
Common eider (Somateria mollissima)

 North Sea 
European lobster (Homarus gammarus)
Nursehound (Scyliorhinus stellaris)
Small-spotted catshark (Scyliorhinus canicula)
Blonde ray (Raja brachyura)
Thornback ray (Raja clavata)
Herring (Clupeus harengus)
Atlantic mackerel (Scomber scombrus)
Thicklip grey mullet (Chelon labrosus)
Different species of wrasse
Moon jellyfish (Aurelia aurita)

 Atlantic Ocean 
Nurse shark (Ginglymostoma cirratum)
Green sea turtle (Chelonia mydas)
Hawksbill sea turtle (Eretmochelys imbricata)
Southern stingray (Dasyatis americana)
Great barracuda (Sphyraena barracuda)
Atlantic tarpon (Megalops atlanticus)

 Caribbean 
Green moray eel (Gymnothorax funebris)
Scribbled filefish (Aluterus scriptus)
Slender seahorse (Hippocampus reidi)

 The Antilles 
Desmarest's hutia (Capromys pilorides)
Aruba rattlesnake (Crotalus unicolor)
Cuban boa (Epicrates angulifer)
Plumed basilisk (Basiliscus plumifrons)
Utila iguana (Ctenosaura bakeri)
Red-bellied piranha (Pygocentrus nattereri)
Black pacu (Colossoma macropomum)
Cuvier's dwarf caiman (Paleosuchus palpebrosus)
Bonnethead shark (Sphyrna tiburo)
Cownose ray (Rhinoptera bonasus)

 Falklands 
King penguin (Aptenodytes patagonica)
Gentoo penguin (Pygoscelis papua)

 Galápagos 
Galapagos giant tortoise (Geochelone nigra)

 Sea of Cortez 
Swift fox (Vulpes velox)
Rock squirrel (Spermophilus variegatus)
Greater roadrunner (Geococcyx californianus)
Burrowing owl (Speotyto cunicularia)
Chuckwalla (Sauromalus species)
Gila monster (Heloderma suspectum)
Eastern king snake (Lampropeltis getulus)
Colorado River toad (Bufo alvarius)
Fish

 Californian Kelp Sea 
Giant Pacific octopus (Enteroctopus dofleini)
Leopard shark (Triakis semifasciata)
Horn shark (Heterodontus francisci)
Californian sea lion (Zalophus californianus)
Sea stars, sea urchins and others

Other animals
Asiatic lion (Panthera leo persica)
Heliconius and other butterflies
Meerkat (Suricata suricatta)
Swamp wallaby (Wallabia bicolor)

Notes

External links

Dutch Zoo Federation 
Zoo Magazine
More complete list of animals (mostly correct)

Botanical gardens in the Netherlands
Zoos in the Netherlands
Tourist attractions in Rotterdam
Buildings and structures in Rotterdam
Rotterdam